Troschelviana is a genus of land snails with an operculum, terrestrial gastropod mollusks in the family Helicinidae.

Species 
Species within the genus Troschelviana include:
 Troschelviana callosa (Poey, 1854)
 Troschelviana chrysochasma (Poey, 1853)
 Troschelviana continua (Gundlach in Pfeiffer, 1858)
 Troschelviana erythraea (Wright in Sowerby, 1866)
 Troschelviana granulum (Gundlach in Pfeiffer, 1864)
 Troschelviana hians (Poey, 1852)
 Troschelviana holguinensis (Aguayo, 1932)
 Troschelviana jugulata (Poey, 1858)
 Troschelviana mestrei (Arango, 1879)
 Troschelviana methfesseli (Pfeiffer, 1862)
 Troschelviana petitiana (d’Orbigny, 1842)
 Troschelviana pfeifferiana (Arango in Pfeiffer, 1866)
 Troschelviana pyramidalis (Sowerby, 1842)
 Troschelviana rubromarginata (Gundlach in Poey, 1858)
 Troschelviana rupestris (Pfeiffer, 1839)
 Troschelviana scopulorum (Morelet, 1849)
 Troschelviana spinipoma (Aguayo, 1943)
 Troschelviana tumidula (Clench & Aguayo, 1957)

References 

 Bank, R. A. (2017). Classification of the Recent terrestrial Gastropoda of the World. Last update: July 16th, 2017.

Helicinidae